John Francis Dunleavy (born 3 July 1991) is an Irish footballer who plays as a defender. He currently plays for Finn Harps in the League of Ireland.

Career
Dunleavy joined Wolverhampton Wanderers academy in October 2006, rejecting the chance to join clubs such as Manchester United and Celtic, despite a very strong academic record. He signed a two-year professional contract near the end of the 2008–09 season during which the club were promoted to the Premier League.

In January 2011 he headed for a loan spell at League Two side Barnet, where he made his professional debut in a game against Southend. He made three appearances for the Bees as they battled relegation from the Football League before suffering ligament damage during training that ended his season.

He left Wolves in Summer 2011 after not being offered an extension to his contract. In late August 2011, Dunleavy joined Major League Soccer club Vancouver Whitecaps on trial until 7 September 2011.

In January 2012, Dunleavy joined Cork City where he captained the club for a number of seasons, however injuries curtailed most of his likely appearances.

Dunleavy signed for Sligo Rovers in December 2018 ahead of the 2019 campaign.

Career statistics
Professional appearances – correct as of 17 October 2020.

Honours
Cork City
 League of Ireland Premier Division: 2017
 FAI Cup: 2016, 2017
 President's Cup: 2016, 2017, 2018
 Munster Senior Cup: 2016–17, 2017–18

References

External links
 

1991 births
Living people
Wolverhampton Wanderers F.C. players
Barnet F.C. players
Cork City F.C. players
Sligo Rovers F.C. players
People from Ballybofey
Republic of Ireland association footballers
Republic of Ireland under-21 international footballers
Association footballers from County Donegal
English Football League players
Association football defenders
Association football midfielders